Love in High Gear is a 1932 American Pre-Code comedy film directed by Frank R. Strayer and starring silent veteran Harrison Ford in his final film role and co–starring Alberta Vaughn,Tyrell Davis and Arthur Hoyt. It was released by the independent Mayfair Pictures.

Plot
Ronald and Betty plan to elope, but are overheard by a jewel thief who has just stolen a pearl necklace from the wedding Ronald and Betty were attending. The jewel thief plans to use the situation to his advantage and a mad chase ensues towards the end of the film.

Cast
Harrison Ford as Donald Ransome
Alberta Vaughn as Betty
Tyrell Davis as Ronald Courtney	 
Arthur Hoyt as Thaddeus Heath
Ethel Wales as Arabella Heath 
Fred Kelsey as Detective Duffy	 
Fern Emmett as Hotel maid 
Jack Duffy as Hotel proprietor
 William H. Strauss as 	Ziegman
 Nanette Vallon as Senorita del Val
 John Ince as Minister

References

Bibliography
 Pitts, Michael R. Poverty Row Studios, 1929–1940: An Illustrated History of 55 Independent Film Companies, with a Filmography for Each. McFarland & Company, 2005.

1932 films
1932 comedy films
American comedy films
Films directed by Frank R. Strayer
American black-and-white films
Mayfair Pictures films
1930s English-language films
1930s American films